The Armstrong Siddeley Leopard was a British 14-cylinder twin-row air-cooled radial aero engine developed in 1927 by Armstrong Siddeley. It was the most powerful radial engine in the world when introduced.

Variants
Leopard I
700 hp, medium supercharged. Direct drive propeller.
Leopard II
700 hp, geared epicyclic drive.
Leopard III
800 hp, two-valve cylinder head, direct drive.
Leopard IIIA
800 hp, geared epicyclic drive.

Applications
Blackburn Iris
Junkers Ju 52
Hawker Dantorp
Hawker Horsley

Specifications (Leopard I)

See also

References

Notes

Bibliography

 Lumsden, Alec. British Piston Engines and their Aircraft. Marlborough, Wiltshire: Airlife Publishing, 2003. .
 Mason, Francis K. Hawker Aircraft since 1920 (third ed.). London: Putnam, 1991. .
 Smith, Herschel. Aircraft Piston Engines. New York, New York: McGraw-Hill, 1981. .

1920s aircraft piston engines
Aircraft air-cooled radial piston engines
Leopard